Zinc finger protein 200 is a protein that in humans is encoded by the ZNF200 gene.

References

Further reading 

Human proteins